Büklümlü is a village in the Keban District of Elazığ Province in Turkey. Its population is 67 (2021). The village is populated by Kurds.

References

Villages in Keban District
Kurdish settlements in Elazığ Province